The Glendale Ridge Archaeological Site (12 Da 86) is an archaeological site located near Hudsonville in Indiana, United States. The site was listed on the National Register of Historic Places on May 30, 1985; its listing erroneously refers to the site as the Glendale River Archaeological Site.

References

Archaeological sites on the National Register of Historic Places in Indiana
Geography of Daviess County, Indiana
Archaic period in North America
National Register of Historic Places in Daviess County, Indiana